Pyrgacris descampsi is a species of insect, belonging to the family of  Pyrgacrididae.

This species is known from La Réunion.

References
 Kevan, D.K.M. (1976), S. Afr. J. Sci. 72
 Kevan, D.K.M. [Ed.] In Beier [Ed.] (1977) Superfamily Acridoidea, fam. Pyrgomorphidae, Orthopterorum Catalogus, Orthopterorum Catalogus 16:1-656
  Hugel (2005) Redécouverte du genre Pygacris à l'île de la Réunion: description du mâle de P. descampi Kevan, 1975 (Orthoptera, Caelifera) [Rediscovery of the genus Pyrgacris to the Reunion island: description of the male of P. descampi Kevan, 1975 (Orthoptera, Caelife, Bulletin de la Société Entomologique de France (Bull. Soc. entomol. Fr.) 110(2):153-159

Caelifera
Insects described in 1976